Elizabeth Theresa Wheeler (born July 12, 1989) is an American conservative political commentator, author, and podcast host. From 2015 to 2020, Wheeler hosted One America News Network (OANN)'s Tipping Point with Liz Wheeler, where she was known for her finale segment, "Final Point." In 2019, Wheeler published her first book, Tipping Points: How to Topple the Left's House of Cards. In September 2020, Wheeler left OANN and currently hosts a podcast, The Liz Wheeler Show.

Career 
In 2013, Wheeler at age 24 partnered with 13 other young conservatives to co-author and publish Young, Conservative, & Why it's Smart to be Like Us. The book went to #2 on Amazon's Civics Books List.

On October 26, 2015, Wheeler was introduced as the host of the primetime talk show Tipping Point with Liz Wheeler, which aired weeknights at 9 PM ET/6 PM PT on One America News Network (OANN).

Wheeler spoke at Conservative Political Action Conference (CPAC) in 2016. She speaks at Young America's Foundation events. In 2018, Wheeler was profiled by Politico magazine as a "titan" of conservative media alongside Ben Shapiro, Sean Hannity, Laura Ingraham, Mark Levin, Tucker Carlson, Dana Loesch, and others. In the Politico profile, Wheeler said she chose a career in political media because: "We're at a point that we're replacing God with government. So, instead of debating theology, instead of debating family, we're looking at government and looking to politics for the answers—and that's why everyone is so obsessed with it."

In a 2018 segment on OANN, Wheeler falsely claimed that a proposed California bill would ban the sale of Bibles. Snopes determined that the claim was a misrepresentation; the bill actually targeted gay conversion therapy.

In 2019, Regnery Publishing published Wheeler's first book, Tipping Points: How to Topple the Left's House of Cards. In 2020, President Donald Trump issued a tweet encouraging his followers to "buy the book" and "give Liz great reviews."

In a May 2020 segment on OANN, Wheeler claimed without evidence that "mainstream media pretended there was a deadly surge in COVID cases" after the 2020 Wisconsin Spring election. PolitiFact rated the claim "Pants on Fire", having found that there were no references to a "surge" in their review of state and national articles about the election, and that reports had accurately listed the number of COVID-19 cases potentially related to the election. At OANN, Wheeler denounced Black Lives Matter protesters as "trained Marxists".

In September 2020, Wheeler announced her departure from OANN.

In a January 2021 video titled "Fauci lied to you AGAIN", Wheeler made false claims about Anthony Fauci, COVID-19, and the effectiveness of face masks. FactCheck.org determined that Wheeler had falsely claimed that Fauci "lied" to the American public about the pandemic, and that she misled about COVID-19 vaccination prioritization and distorted the findings of a scientific paper to claim that face masks do not need to be worn by healthy people.

On May 25, 2021, Wheeler premiered her podcast, The Liz Wheeler Show. In an episode posted on June 30, 2021, Wheeler falsely claimed that a "peer reviewed, scientific study showed that the COVID-19 vaccine causes two deaths for every three lives it saves." The video was flagged by Facebook as part of its efforts to combat misinformation, and PolitiFact found that the MDPI Vaccines journal, which had published the study, had posted a notice raising serious questions about it two days prior to the episode being uploaded. The notice called the study's conclusions a "misrepresentation of the data" and stated that the authors' assertion that the deaths were caused by vaccination efforts was "incorrect and distorted".

In March 2022, Wheeler falsely claimed that hepatitis B vaccination in newborns was unsafe and unnecessary unless the mother was infected with the hepatitis B virus, and that the vaccine failed to prevent infection by the time vaccinated people became sexually active. In January 2023, following football player Damar Hamlin's in-game collapse, Wheeler promoted a conspiracy theory that the COVID-19 vaccine was responsible for a "surge" in athlete deaths and injuries.

Personal life
Wheeler is Catholic. She was married in 2017 to Daniel Moyer, and her first child was born in 2021.

References 

1989 births
Living people
Catholics from Ohio
One America News personalities
21st-century American women writers
21st-century American non-fiction writers
21st-century Roman Catholics
American women non-fiction writers
American political writers
American Roman Catholics
Women political writers
Writers from Cincinnati
American political commentators
Pennsylvania State University alumni